Chapai Nawabganj Stadium  is located by the PTI Bishwa Rd, Nawabganj, Bangladesh.

See also
 Stadiums in Bangladesh
 List of cricket grounds in Bangladesh

References

Cricket grounds in Bangladesh
Football venues in Bangladesh